The Stucklistock is a mountain in the Urner Alps, overlooking the valley of Meiental in the canton of Uri. It lies only a few kilometres south-east of Susten Pass. The Stucklistock is surrounded by glaciers, the largest, named Rütifirn, lying on its east flank.

References

External links
Stucklistock on Summitpost
Stucklistock on Hikr

Mountains of the Alps
Alpine three-thousanders
Mountains of the canton of Uri
Mountains of Switzerland